The Liberty of Religious Worship Act 1855 (18 & 19 Vict., c. 86) was an Act of the Parliament of the United Kingdom.

Previously the Toleration Act 1689 required all Dissenting places of worship to be registered and the Places of Religious Worship Act 1812 had reiterated that requirement for all Dissenting gatherings of over twenty people, at penalty of a forfeit of 20 shillings to £20 for building owners who failed to register. Part I of the 1855 Act removed all penalties in the 1689 and 1812 Act and in the Protestant Dissenters Act 1852 for any services held by the curate or incumbent of any Church of England parish or ecclesiastical district, any congregation meeting in a "private Dwelling house or on the Premises belonging thereto" or any "Congregation or Assembly for Religious Worship" in a building or buildings "not usually appropriated to Purposes of Religious Worship", as well as all the penalties in those three Acts for the buildings' owners for permitting their use for such services. Part II extended all post-1855 legislation on Dissenting congregations also to cover Roman Catholic and Jewish worship.

References

United Kingdom Acts of Parliament 1855
English Dissenters
Freedom of religion
Jewish British history
History of Catholicism in the United Kingdom
Catholicism and politics
History of Christianity in the United Kingdom
History of religion in the United Kingdom